The electoral district of Bulleen is an electoral district of the Victorian Legislative Assembly. It lies within the Eastern Metropolitan Region of the upper house, the Legislative Council.

Bulleen was created in 1985, and has been a safe seat for the Liberal Party since its inception. It was won at its first election by David Perrin, the outgoing secretary of the Victorian Dairy Industry Authority. Perrin served four terms as member for the seat, and was an outspoken conservative backbencher during the Kennett government, opposing Kennett on drug reform, euthanasia, and gay and lesbian anti-discrimination laws. In 1999, Perrin lost Liberal preselection to former Kennett adviser Nicholas Kotsiras in a bitter contest which saw numerous claims of branch stacking.

Kotsiras subsequently also served four terms as member for Bulleen. He held many shadow portfolios in opposition between 2002 and 2010, and served as a minister in both the Baillieu and Napthine governments from 2010 to 2014. He held the roles of Minister for Multicultural Affairs and Citizenship from 2010 to 2014, and Minister for Energy and Resources from 2013 to 2014. In early 2014, Kotsiras announced that he would retire at the 2014 election, and resigned from the ministry in March.

Kotsiras was succeeded as member for Bulleen by then-Legislative Council member and Minister for Planning Matthew Guy, who successfully switched to the Legislative Assembly. Guy was elected Opposition Leader in December 2014 in the aftermath of the Liberal government's election defeat.

Members for Bulleen

Election results

References

External links
 Electorate profile: Bulleen, Victorian Electoral Commission

1985 establishments in Australia
Electoral districts of Victoria (Australia)
City of Manningham
Electoral districts and divisions of Greater Melbourne